The 2022–23 season is the 117th season in the existence of Crystal Palace Football Club and the club's tenth consecutive season in the Premier League (further extending their longest ever spell in the top-flight). In addition to the league, they also competed in the FA Cup and the EFL Cup.

Season summary

Pre-season
Palace finished the previous season in 12th place and reached the semi-final of the FA Cup, the first under manager Patrick Vieira. Martin Kelly and Cheikhou Kouyaté left at the end of their contracts and player of the season, Conor Gallagher, returned to Chelsea at the end of his loan spell. Malcolm Ebiowei and Sam Johnstone joined after their contracts at Derby and West Bromwich Albion expired while Cheick Doucouré and Chris Richards were signed from Lens and Bayern Munich respectively.

The club went on a pre-season tour to Singapore and Australia to play other Premier League teams; they were defeated by  Liverpool and Manchester United and drew against Leeds. Only half the squad were able to make the trip, so there were also games in England against teams from various divisions of the Football League. In these matches Palace won four and drew the other. The whole squad was able to play in a home game against Montpellier, which Palace won 4–2.

August
Crystal Palace opened the Premier League season with a game against Arsenal at Selhurst Park on Friday 5 August. The visitors started the strongest and took the lead with a goal in the 20th minute from a corner. Palace came back into the game, but squandered a couple of chances to equalise and a late own goal from Marc Guéhi consigned the team to a 2–0 defeat. On the same day, Christian Benteke was sold to D.C. United. Their first away game was a 1–1 draw against Liverpool at Anfield. The next game, at home to Aston Villa, saw the team's first win of the season, with Wilfried Zaha scoring a brace of goals in a 3–1 victory. Palace were drawn away against Oxford United in the second round of the Carabao Cup, winning the tie 0–2 with youth-teamers Killian Phillips and Kaden Rodney making their senior debuts.

Transfers

In

Out

Loans in

Loans out

Pre-season and friendlies
Palace announced they would visit Singapore, for a friendly against Liverpool, and Australia with matches against Manchester United and Leeds United. They also played a home friendly against French side Montpellier. Two further friendlies were confirmed, against Accrington Stanley and Millwall behind-closed-doors. An away trip to Queens Park Rangers was scheduled for 23 July. A further addition, against Gillingham was later confirmed.

During the mid-season winter break for the 2022 FIFA World Cup, Palace announced they would host Botafogo and Valladolid in December. Two further fixtures against Napoli and Trabzonspor was also confirmed for the Eagles.

Competitions

Overall record

Premier League

League table

Results summary

Results by round

Matches

On 16 June, the Premier League fixtures were released.

FA Cup

Palace joined the FA Cup at the third round stage, and were drawn at home to Southampton.

EFL Cup

Crystal Palace entered the competition in the second round and were drawn away to Oxford United. A 2–0 victory saw them through to the next round, where they were again drawn away, this time to fellow Premier League team Newcastle United. Palace lost this game on a penalty shoot-out after the game finished goalless.

Statistics

Appearances 

|-
! colspan=14 style=background:#DCDCDC; text-align:center| Goalkeepers

|-
! colspan=14 style=background:#DCDCDC; text-align:center| Defenders

|-
! colspan=14 style=background:#DCDCDC; text-align:center| Midfielders

|-
! colspan=14 style=background:#DCDCDC; text-align:center| Forwards

|}

Goalscorers 
The list is sorted by shirt number when total goals are equal.

Clean sheets
The list is sorted by shirt number when total clean sheets are equal.

References

Crystal Palace
Crystal Palace F.C. seasons
Crystal Palace
Crystal Palace
English football clubs 2022–23 season